Jack Murray may refer to:
Jack Murray (Australian footballer) (born 1913), Australian rules footballer
John Murray (Victorian politician) (1851–1916), Australian politician
John W. Murray (died 1996), American pastor, evangelist, and educator
Jack Murray (film editor) (1900–1961), American film editor
Jack Murray (cricketer) (1892–1974), Australian cricketer
Jack Murray (racing driver) (1907–1983), "Gelignite Jack", Australian rally driver
Jack Keith Murray (1889–1979), administrator of the Australian Territories of Papua and New Guinea

See also
John Murray (disambiguation)